Agustín Rubín de Ceballos (June 24, 1724 – February 8, 1793) was a Spanish churchman who was Bishop of Jaén from 1780 to 1793 and Grand Inquisitor of Spain from 1784 to 1793.

Biography

Agustín Rubin de Ceballos was born in Dueñas, Palencia on June 24, 1724.  Pursuing a career in the Catholic Church, he became a canon of Cuenca Cathedral.  In 1780, Charles III of Spain chose him to be Bishop of Jaén.  He became Grand Inquisitor of Spain in 1784.  In 1790, at the request of José Moñino, 1st Count of Floridablanca, he published a new Index of Prohibited Books to halt the spread of ideas associated with the French Revolution in Spain.  He died in Madrid on February 8, 1794.  His body was transferred to Jaén, Spain and he was buried in Jaén Cathedral.

References

This page is based on this page on Spanish Wikipedia.

1724 births
1793 deaths
Grand Inquisitors of Spain
Bishops of Jaén
18th-century Roman Catholic bishops in Spain